International Rally of Messina (in Italian Rally internazionale di Messina) was a former rally competition that was held in Messina, Italy.

History

The event was held for 26 editions, from 1979 to 2004 and was part of the European Rally Championship schedule and the Italian national rally championship.

Many of Italian top drivers for several years fought for the Italian title, because the rally was one of the last race of the season, and often decisive. Among the winners are remembered Andrea Aghini, Franco Cunico and Piero Liatti.

Editions

See also
 Messina Grand Prix

References

External links
 Cinque gloriose manifestazioni sportive che non esistono più 
International Rally of Messina at Ewrc-results.com
International Rally of Messina - Winners
Rally di Messina Roll of Honour

Messina
Rally
Sports competitions in Messina
Auto races in Italy